UFC Fight Night: Mendes vs. Lamas (also known as UFC Fight Night 63) was a mixed martial arts event held on April 4, 2015, at the Patriot Center in Fairfax, Virginia.

Background
The event was the third that the organization hosted at the venue and the first since 2012. The preliminary portion of the card began at 11 a.m. ET / 8 a.m. PT, with the main card starting at 1:00 p.m. ET / 10:00 a.m. PT, a rare time slot for UFC events held in North America.

The event was headlined by a featherweight bout between former title challengers Chad Mendes and Ricardo Lamas.

Jorge Masvidal was briefly linked to a bout with Bobby Green at the event. However, shortly after the bout was announced by the UFC, Green pulled out of the bout citing a leg injury, and was replaced by former WEC & UFC Lightweight champion Benson Henderson Subsequently, Henderson was removed from the bout with Masvidal as he was tabbed as a replacement for Stephen Thompson to face Brandon Thatch in the event headliner on February 14, 2015, at UFC Fight Night 60. On February 2, Al Iaquinta was announced as Masvidal's new opponent.

Clint Hester was expected to face Luke Barnatt at this event. However, Hester pulled out of the fight in early March due to a foot injury. Subsequently, Barnett was pulled from the card entirely in favor of a matchup with Mark Muñoz in May at UFC Fight Night 66.

Results

Bonus awards
The following fighters were awarded $50,000 bonuses:

Fight of the Night: None awarded
Performance of the Night: Chad Mendes, Julianna Peña, Dustin Poirier, and Timothy Johnson

Reported payout
The following is the reported payout to the fighters as reported to the Virginia Boxing, MMA and Wrestling Advisory Board. It does not include sponsor money or "locker room" bonuses often given by the UFC and also do not include the UFC's traditional "fight night" bonuses.

Chad Mendes: $96,000 ($48,000 win bonus) def. Ricardo Lamas: $35,000
Al Iaquinta: $46,000 ($23,000 win bonus) def. Jorge Masvidal: $51,000
Michael Chiesa: $48,000 ($24,000 win bonus) def. Mitch Clarke: $12,000
Julianna Peña: $30,000 ($15,000 win bonus) def. Milana Dudieva: $10,000
Clay Guida: $100,000 ($50,000 win bonus) def. Robbie Peralta: $18,000
Dustin Poirier: $68,000 ($34,000 win bonus) def. Carlos Diego Ferreira: $15,000
Liz Carmouche: $34,000 ($17,000 win bonus) def. Lauren Murphy: $8,000
Alexander Yakovlev: $16,000 ($8,000 win bonus) def. Gray Maynard: $48,000
Timothy Johnson: $16,000 ($8,000 win bonus) def. Shamil Abdurahimov: $12,000
Ron Stallings: $20,000 ($10,000 win bonus) def. Justin Jones: $8,000

See also
List of UFC events
2015 in UFC

References

UFC Fight Night
Mixed martial arts in Virginia
Sports in Fairfax, Virginia
2015 in mixed martial arts
April 2015 sports events in the United States